Kalibo International Airport (Aklanon: Paeoparang Pangkalibutan it Kalibo,) is an international airport that serves the general area of Kalibo, the capital of the province of Aklan in the Philippines, and is one of two airports serving Boracay, the other being Godofredo P. Ramos Airport (also known as Caticlan Airport) in the municipality of Malay. It is the fastest growing airport in the Philippines in terms of passenger traffic with more than 50% growth in 2010, and 2nd fastest for seats offered for June 2014 over the corresponding month of the previous year (20%). The airport is classified as an international airport by the Civil Aviation Authority of the Philippines, a body of the Department of Transportation responsible for the operations of all airports in the Philippines except major international airports.

Expansion and development

On March 31, 2008, construction of the airport's new terminal building commenced. The said construction is part of the  fund pledged by President Gloria Macapagal Arroyo in 2007 for the upgrade of the airport which is being geared to become an international landmark for tourism. The package includes 80 million pesos for the new terminal, while  was released in 2009 by the Department of Budget and Management for the installation of an Instrument Landing System (ILS).

The Kalibo International Airport has one of the busiest international flight activity in Western Visayas. Regular and chartered flights accommodate thousands of travelers during the holidays from Asian routes to the capital town of Kalibo.

The construction of the new terminal building is to start as soon as possible. There is also to be widening and extension of the apron and expansion of the tarmac, plus additional aircraft parking, airport lights and vehicular parking.

A  expansion and rehabilitation project for the terminal building begun on July 2, 2018 as part of the Build! Build! Build! program of the government that has been pushing for the development and expansion of existing infrastructures such as airports. Rehabilition works were completed on September 15, 2020. The entire rehabilitation project, which included the rehabilitation of the terminal, reblocking of apron pavement and upgrades to the nearby facilities, was inaugurated on June 4, 2021.

Structure

Runway
It can accommodate narrow-body aircraft such as the Airbus A320 family.

Passenger terminal
The airport has a two-level passenger terminal building. The first level houses the check-in counters, security checks, and the pre-departure area. The second level houses the airline offices in the check-in area, and various kiosks. The pre-departure area also has restaurants and pasalubong centers.

Airlines and destinations

Statistics
Data from Civil Aviation Authority of the Philippines (CAAP).

An em dash (—) is used if data from CAAP is not available.

Incidents and accidents
On February 13, 2012, Airphil Express Flight 969, an Airbus A320-214 from Manila with 135 people on board, overshot the runway. No injuries or aircraft damage occurred in the incident.
On December 19, 2013, Zest Air Flight 058, an Airbus A320-232 departing for Busan, skidded off the runway while doing a 180-degree turn at the runway. No injuries among the 144 passengers and crew were reported.
 On December 30, 2014, AirAsia Zest Flight 272, an Airbus A320-216 from Manila, overshot the runway during landing. All 159 passengers and crew survived with no injuries.
 On April 14, 2016, SEAir International Flight 3091, an Airbus A320-231 from Seoul (Incheon), blew one of its tires after touchdown. All 156 passengers and crew evacuated with no injuries.

Notes

References

External links

 KIA Flights tracker
 Satellite image from maps.google.com
 
 

Airports in the Philippines
Kalibo
Buildings and structures in Aklan
Transportation in the Visayas